Rock Mill or Rock Mills may refer to

Locations
 Rock Mills, Alabama, United States
 Rock Mills, Alabama, census-designated place in Randolph County, Alabama, United States
 Rock Mills, Ohio, an unincorporated community
 Rock Mills, Virginia, unincorporated community in Rappahannock County, Virginia, United States
 Rock Mills, Ontario, community in Ontario, Canada

Mills
Rock Mill, Ashton-under-Lyne Lancashire. A cotton mill
Rock Mill, one of the Historic mills of the Atlanta area, Atlanta, Georgia, United States
Rock Mill, Washington, West Sussex. A windmill
The Rock Mill, Rockville, Connecticut, United States